Ghost Writer is a 2010 Hong Kong television series produced by TVB, starring Steven Ma and Linda Chung. The protagonist of the series, Po Chung-ling, is based on the author of Strange Stories from a Chinese Studio, a collection of Chinese tales on the supernatural. The series tells how he was inspired to write those stories based on his personal encounters with the supernatural, as well as her relationship with Lau Sum-Yu.

Plot
Po Chung-Ling was born in Jinan a family of New Year print. He is very bright, his father, Po Poon, has therefore always hoped that he could one day carry on the family business. Ling, mistakenly thinks that Poon is working in collusion with some corrupt officials, refuses to listen to what his father says. His good friend, Ko Jit, is a constable and he hates corrupt officials as much as Ling does. Rumor has it that a fox spirit is creating troubles in Jinan. Ling is almost killed when he is investigating into the matter with Jit. A mysterious girl named Ling Wu Siu-Tsui comes to his rescue in the nick of time. It turns out later that she is the fox spirit, and that she saves Ling so as to return a past favour. As they spend more and more time together, Tsui starts to fall for Ling.

The Po family has secured a large order of New Year print. To ensure the work can be finished in time they have to hire a large numbers of female workers. Lau Sum-Yu applies for the job, but her real intention is to look for the man who was unfaithful to her sister, never knowing that she would later be caught in a love triangle with Ling and Jit.

Cast
 Note: Some of the characters' names are in Cantonese romanisation.

Po family

Lau family

Ko family

Ling Wu family

Other cast

Awards and nominations
TVB Anniversary Awards (2010)
 Best Drama
 Best Actor (Steven Ma) (Top 5)
 Best Actress (Linda Chung) (Top 5)
 Best Supporting Actress (Fala Chen) (Top 15)
 Most Improved Actress (Elaine Yiu)

Trivia
 The last episode ends with footage from previous TVB production based on the tales of Pu Songling, namely Dark Tales and Dark Tales II.

Viewership ratings

<Ghost Writer> Average Points 32, Peaking 41.

References

External links
  

2010 Hong Kong television series debuts
2010 Hong Kong television series endings
Television series set in the Qing dynasty
TVB dramas
Television shows based on Strange Stories from a Chinese Studio